Armoy is a commune in the Haute-Savoie department and Auvergne-Rhône-Alpes region of eastern France.

The commune covers an area of 4.95 square kilometres and lies between 415 and 674 metres above sea level. The inhabitants, of whom there were 1,287 in 2018, are known as Armoisiens.

See also
Communes of the Haute-Savoie department

References

Communes of Haute-Savoie